Ernest A. Calverley (January 30, 1924 – October 20, 2003) was an American professional basketball player. He was an All-American while playing for the University of Rhode Island. He played professionally with the Providence Steamrollers of the Basketball Association of America for three seasons from 1946 to 1949. Calverley led the league in assists and was an All-BAA Second Team selection in his first season in the league.

College career
Calverley was retroactively declared the men's basketball season scoring leader for 1944. But Calverley was most notable for one particular shot. Dubbed the "shot heard round the world", it was a midcourt shot from 62 feet away, as time expired at Madison Square Garden in the 1946 National Invitation Tournament against Bowling Green to tie the game and send it to overtime. Even after 50 years, he stated that he didn't think it was going to go in, as he had to make sure it did not hit the scoreboard while shooting with both hands. Rhode Island State (now known as the University of Rhode Island) would win 82–79 in overtime to send them to the semifinal round. The Rams would eventually lose in the NIT final against Adolph Rupp's Kentucky Wildcats by one point. Not soon after, Calverley would join the BAA.

Professional career
Calverley led in assists per game in the league's first and second years, while playing for his home state team, the Providence Steamrollers. In his rookie season, Calverley was selected to the All-BAA Second Team. In his career, he missed only three games (one for each season). He had a 70.7% free throw percentage, which contrasted with his 29.1% lifetime field goal percentage. He was drafted by the Boston Celtics from the Providence Steamrollers in the dispersal draft in 1949 after the team disbanded. A month later, he was put on waivers, and he never played again.

Later life
He later returned to URI to coach the Rams and led them to two NCAA Division I men's basketball tournament appearances in 1961 and 1966, losing both times in the first round. Calverely died of complications of an infection after insertion of a pacemaker on October 20, 2003.

BAA career statistics

Regular season

References

External links

Ernie Calverley obituary, New York Times, 29 October 2003 (retrieved 3 April 2015).

1924 births
2003 deaths
All-American college men's basketball players
American men's basketball players
Basketball coaches from Rhode Island
Basketball players from Rhode Island
College men's basketball head coaches in the United States
Point guards
Providence Friars men's basketball coaches
Providence Steamrollers players
Rhode Island Rams men's basketball coaches
Rhode Island Rams men's basketball players
Sportspeople from Pawtucket, Rhode Island